Interferon alpha-10 is a protein that in humans is encoded by the IFNA10 gene.

References

Further reading